Utica Township is one of twelve townships in Clark County, Indiana. As of the 2010 census, its population was 6,016 and it contained 2,422 housing units.

History
Utica Township was organized in 1831. It was named after the town of Utica, Indiana.

Geography

Cities and towns
 Jeffersonville (northeast quarter)
 Utica

Unincorporated towns
 Longview Beach
 Prather
 River Ridge
 Watson
(This list is based on USGS data and may include former settlements.)

Adjacent townships
 Charlestown Township (north)
 Jeffersonville Township (southwest)
 Silver Creek Township (west)

Major highways
  Interstate 265
  Indiana State Road 3

Cemeteries
The township contains many cemeteries: Adams Family, Barnett (aka Adams Cemetery), Briar Hill, Burtt, Friend (aka Dailey), Hillcrest, Koonz Cemetery, Lentz Family, Lentz Heirs, New Chapel, Queen of Heaven, Smith, Stacy, Union, Utica, and Washington.

References
 United States Census Bureau cartographic boundary files
 U.S. Board on Geographic Names

External links

 Indiana Township Association
 United Township Association of Indiana

Townships in Clark County, Indiana
Townships in Indiana
Populated places established in 1831
1831 establishments in Indiana